Christina Elizabeth "Dixie" Dunbar (January 19, 1919 – August 29, 1991) was an American singer, film actress, and dancer.

Born in Montgomery, Alabama, Dunbar grew up in Atlanta, Georgia. She began studying dancing as a child and went on to sing and dance in nightclubs.

In 1934, she was Ray Bolger's dancing partner in the revue Life Begins at 8:40, which was staged in Boston. She also performed in that show on Broadway in 1934-35 and the Broadway productions of Yokel Boy (1939–40) and George White's Scandals (1934).

Dunbar's film debut also came in George White's Scandals (1934). During the 1930s she appeared in a number of Twentieth Century Fox films, including two Jones Family films.

After she left Broadway and films, she returned to nightclubs, performing for a while before she retired.

Selected filmography

 George While's Scandal (1934)
 Educating Father (1936)
 Sing, Baby, Sing (1936)
 One in a Million (1936)
 King of Burlesque (1936)
 Girls' Dormitory (1936)
 Pigskin Parade (1936)
 Sing and Be Happy (1937)
 Walking Down Broadway (1938)
 Rebecca of Sunnybrook Farm (1938)
 Alexander's Ragtime Band (1938)

References

External links

1919 births
1991 deaths
American film actresses
20th-century American singers
Actresses from Montgomery, Alabama
Musicians from Montgomery, Alabama
20th-century American women singers
20th-century American actresses